Víctor Francis (born 30 May 1933) is a Venezuelan former sports shooter. He competed in the 25 metre pistol event at the 1972 Summer Olympics.

References

1933 births
Living people
Venezuelan male sport shooters
Olympic shooters of Venezuela
Shooters at the 1972 Summer Olympics
Place of birth missing (living people)